Burbage is a surname. Notable people with the surname include:

 Cornell Burbage (born 1965), American football player and coach
 Cuthbert Burbage (c. 1565–1636), English stage actor and brother of Richard Burbage
 Jake Burbage (born 1992), American actor and writer
 James Burbage (c. 1531–1597), English actor and stage builder, father of Richard and Cuthbert Burbage
 Jessie Burbage, American basketball player
 Richard Burbage (c. 1567–1619), English stage actor and brother of Cuthbert Burbage

Fictional characters:
 Charity Burbage, minor fictional character in the Harry Potter books